Kim Sun-yong (born 26 May 1987) is a South Korean former professional tennis player.

Kim, who was born in Seoul, won the junior doubles title at the 2005 Australian Open, partnering Taiwan's Yi Chu-huan. He was runner-up in the boys' singles event to Donald Young and was also a singles semi-finalist at the 2005 US Open juniors.

A right-handed player, Kim featured in three Davis Cup ties for South Korea. In 2005 he won both of his singles matches against Pacific Oceania, then played a dead rubber in the Group II final against New Zealand, which he lost to Jose Statham. His only other appearance came in 2007, when he won in the singles against Dmitriy Makeyev of Kazakhstan.

See also
List of South Korea Davis Cup team representatives

References

External links
 
 
 

1987 births
Living people
South Korean male tennis players
Australian Open (tennis) junior champions
Grand Slam (tennis) champions in boys' doubles
Universiade bronze medalists for South Korea
Universiade medalists in tennis
Tennis players from Seoul
Asian Games medalists in tennis
Asian Games bronze medalists for South Korea
Tennis players at the 2006 Asian Games
Medalists at the 2006 Asian Games
Medalists at the 2007 Summer Universiade
21st-century South Korean people